Members of the New South Wales Legislative Council who served from 1901 to 1904 were appointed for life by the Governor on the advice of the Premier. This list includes members between the state election on 3 July 1901 and the state election on 6 August 1904. The President was Sir John Lackey until 23 May 1903 and then Sir Francis Suttor.

Non-Labor party affiliations at this time were fluid, and especially in the Legislative Council regarded more as loose labels than genuine parties.

See also
See ministry
Waddell ministry

Notes

References

Members of New South Wales parliaments by term
20th-century Australian politicians